Parsley sauce is a cream sauce seasoned with parsley.

It is essentially a simple béchamel sauce containing chopped parsley. A variant called "liquor" is often served with pie and mash as a traditional British food, particularly in London.

References 

Sauces